Ícaro Passos de Oliveira (born June 11, 1984 in Tapes, Rio Grande do Sul, Brazil), is a Brazilian footballer. He played as a striker for Sapucaiense.

He is known as  Ícaro in Brazil, but as Oliveira in Hong Kong.

Biography
Early career
Ícaro Oliveira played for Sport Club Internacional, Joinville, São José (POA), Clube 15 de Novembro and Mogi Mirim

After that, he played for Happy Valley A.A.

Ícaro Oliveira returned to Internacional de Santa Maria after being released by Happy Valley. He signed a contract until the end of state league in February 2008.

Career statistics
Club career
As of February 3, 2007

References

External links
Ícaro Passos de Oliveira at HKFA
Profile at HVAACLUB.com
Profile at CBFNEWS.com 
 

1984 births
Living people
Brazilian footballers
Brazilian expatriate footballers
Association football forwards
Brazilian expatriate sportspeople in Hong Kong
Esporte Clube Cruzeiro players
Clube 15 de Novembro players
Oliveira, Icaro Passos
Oliveira, Icaro Passos
Expatriate footballers in Hong Kong